The Mahwah Township Public Schools is a comprehensive community public school district that serves students in pre-kindergarten through twelfth grade from Mahwah, in Bergen County, New Jersey, United States.

As of the 2019–20 school year, the district, comprised of six schools, had an enrollment of 2,913 students and 262.6 classroom teachers (on an FTE basis), for a student–teacher ratio of 11.1:1.

The district is classified by the New Jersey Department of Education as being in District Factor Group "I", the second-highest of eight groupings. District Factor Groups organize districts statewide to allow comparison by common socioeconomic characteristics of the local districts. From the lowest socioeconomic status to highest, the categories are A, B, CD, DE, FG, GH, I and J.

Awards, recognition and rankings
In 2012, Betsy Ross School was recognized by the Blue Ribbon Schools Program, one of 15 schools in the state to receive the recognition from the United States Department of Education.

Schools 
Schools in the district, with 2019–20 enrollment data from the National Center for Education Statistics, are:

Elementary schools
Lenape Meadows Elementary School with 328 students in grades PreK-3
Paul Wyka, Principal
Betsy Ross Elementary School with 241 students in grades K-3
Aixa Garcia, Principal
George Washington Elementary School with 189 students in grades K-3
Jennifer Glebocki, Principal
Joyce Kilmer Elementary School with 414 students in grades 4–5
Dr. Billy Bowie, Principal
Middle school
Ramapo Ridge Middle School with 685 students in grades 6-8
Brian P. Cory, Principal
High school
 Mahwah High School with 900 students in grades 9-12
John P. Pascale, Principal

Administration 
Core members of the district's administration are:
Dr. Michael DeTuro, Superintendent
Kyle J. Bleeker, Business Administrator / Board Secretary

Board of education
The district's board of education, comprised of nine members, sets policy and oversees the fiscal and educational operation of the district through its administration. As a Type II school district, the board's trustees are elected directly by voters to serve three-year terms of office on a staggered basis, with three seats up for election each year held (since 2012) as part of the November general election. The board appoints a superintendent to oversee the day-to-day operation of the district.

References

External links 
Mahwah Township Public Schools

Mahwah Township Public Schools, National Center for Education Statistics
The Mahwah Schools Foundation
The Mahwah 10k Race

Mahwah, New Jersey
New Jersey District Factor Group I
School districts in Bergen County, New Jersey